Death of a Legend was the first of three documentary films by Bill Mason about wolves, helping to dispel the image of wolves as "evil" and demonstrating their role in maintaining the balance of nature. Released in 1971, Death of the Legend was the first documentary to feature footage of wolves being born in the wild, and their first year of life. The film was followed two years later by Mason's feature length theatrical documentary on wolves, Cry of the Wild. Both films were produced by the National Film Board of Canada. Mason completed his third and final film on wolves, Wolf Pack, in 1974.

Awards
 Festival of Tourist and Folklore Films, Brussels: Gold Medal - First Prize, 1971
 Philadelphia International Festival of Short Films, Philadelphia: Award for Exceptional Merit, 1971
23rd Canadian Film Awards, Toronto: Genie Award for Best Colour Cinematography to Bill Mason, 1971
 American Film and Video Festival, New York: Red Ribbon, 1972
 International Festival of Scientific and Didactic Films, Madrid: Diploma of Honour, 1972
 Yorkton Film Festival, Yorkton: Golden Sheaf Award for Best Nature and Wildlife Film, 1973
 Yorkton Film Festival, Yorkton: Golden Sheaf Award for Best Cinematography, 1973
 International Festival of Mountain and Exploration Films, Trento: Golden Rhododendron Award, 1974

References

External links
Watch Death of a Legend at NFB.ca

1971 films
English-language Canadian films
Films directed by Bill Mason
Documentary films about nature
National Film Board of Canada documentaries
Films about wolves
1971 documentary films
Films scored by Eldon Rathburn
1970s English-language films
1970s Canadian films